Poland competed at the 2013 World Championships in Athletics in Moscow, Russia, from 10–18 August 2013.
A team of 55 athlete was announced to represent the country in the event.

Medalists

Results
(q – qualified, NM – no mark, SB – season best)

Men
Track and road events

Field events

Women
Track and road events

Field events

Combined events – Heptathlon

References

External links
IAAF World Championships – Poland

Nations at the 2013 World Championships in Athletics
World Championships in Athletics
Poland at the World Championships in Athletics